In phonetics, a homorganic consonant (from homo- "same" and organ "(speech) organ") is a consonant sound that is articulated in the same place of articulation as another. Consonants that are not articulated in the same place are called heterorganic.

Articulatory position
Descriptive phonetic classification relies on the relationships between a number of technical terms that describe the way sounds are made; and one of the relevant elements involves that place at which a specific sound is formed and voiced. In articulatory phonetics, the specific "place of articulation" or "point of articulation" of a consonant is that point of contact where an obstruction occurs in the vocal tract between an active (moving) articulator (typically some part of the tongue) and a passive (stationary) articulator (typically some part of the roof of the mouth). Along with the manner of articulation and phonation, this gives the consonant its distinctive sound.

Similar articulatory position
Consonants that have a similar or the same place of articulation, such as the alveolar sounds (n, t, d, s, z, l) in English, are said to be homorganic.

Homorganic nasal rule
An example of the rule is found in Yoruba in which ba "meet" becomes mba "is meeting", and sun, "sleep" becomes nsun "is sleeping".

Consonant clustering
Two or more consonant sounds may appear sequentially linked or clustered as either identical consonants or homorganic consonants that differ slightly in the manner of articulation, as when the first consonant is a fricative and the second is a stop.

In some languages, a syllable-initial homorganic sequence of a stop and a nasal is quite uncontroversially treated as a sequence of two separate segments; and the separate status of the stop and the nasal is quite clear. In Russian, the stop + nasal sequences are just one of the possible types amongst many different syllable-initial consonant sequences that occur. In English, nasal + stop sequences within a morpheme must be homorganic.

Consonant length
In languages as diverse as Arabic, Tamil and Icelandic, there is a phonological contrast between long and short consonants, which are distinguishable from consonant clusters. In phonetics, gemination happens when a spoken consonant is pronounced for an audibly longer period of time than a short consonant.

Consonant length is distinctive in some languages. In Japanese, for example, 来た (kita) means 'came; arrived', while 切った (kitta) means 'cut; sliced'. The romanization or transliteration of the sound of each Japanese word produces the misleading impression of a doubled consonant.

See also
Manner of articulation
Relative articulation
List of phonetics topics	
Hepburn romanization
Ƞ

Notes

References
 Aronoff, Mark and Janie Rees-Miller. (2003).  The Handbook of Linguistics. Malden, Massachusetts: Blackwell Publishing. ;  OCLC 185384910

 Ravid, Dorit Diskin, Hava Bat-Zeev Shyldkrot and Ruth Aronson Berman. (2005).  Perspectives on Language and Language Development: Essays in Honor of Ruth A. Berman. Dordrecht: Springer (Kulwer Academic). ;  OCLC 55220212

External links
Interactive places and manners of articulation

Consonants